Pierrick Hiard (born 27 April 1955 in Rennes) is a French former professional footballer who played as a goalkeeper.

External links
Profile
Photos

1955 births
Living people
French footballers
Footballers from Rennes
Association football goalkeepers
France international footballers
Stade Rennais F.C. players
SC Bastia players